Area codes 450, 579 and 354 are telephone area codes in the North American Numbering Plan in the Canadian province of Quebec, encompassing the off-island suburbs of Montreal, as well as the rest of the Montérégie region southward to the border with New York state. Among the cities in the numbering plan area are Laval, Longueuil, Terrebonne, Saint-Jean-sur-Richelieu, Brossard, Repentigny, Saint-Jérôme, Granby, Blainville and Saint-Hyacinthe.  

Area code 450 is also shared by several small communities in an adjacent part of Ontario: some landline customers in Chute-à-Blondeau (East Hawkesbury), near Pointe-Fortune have +1-450-451-xxxx numbers from the Rigaud exchange.

History
Area code 514 served the entire Montreal area for over half-a-century. However, by the mid-1990s, it was on the verge of exhaustion because of Montreal's rapid growth and Canada's inefficient system of number allocation. All competitive local exchange carriers in Canada are allocated blocks of 10,000 numbers for every rate centre in which they plan to offer service, even in the smallest hamlets. Even though most rate centres do not need nearly that many numbers, a number cannot be reallocated elsewhere once it is assigned to a carrier and rate centre. That resulted in thousands of wasted numbers.  By the late 20th century, that made a second area code necessary in Canada's second-largest toll-free calling zone.

Area code 450 entered service in 1998. The numbering plan area completely surrounds area code 514, which was confined to the Island of Montreal and a few surrounding islands, and so it is one of the six pairs of "doughnut area codes" in the numbering plan, and the only one in Canada (Toronto's area code 416 also borders Lake Ontario). For that reason, Montrealers sometimes refer to the off-island suburbs as "les 450" (the 450s), much like the suburbs of Toronto are called "the 905."

On May 7, 2009, the CRTC ruled that area code 438, which had been used as an overlay for area code 514 since 2006, would be extended to overlay area codes 450 and 514. However, a later decision changed that to overlay only area code 450 with the new area code 579, effective August 21, 2010.

On May 2, 2011, a prepaid mobile telephone registered to "Pierre Poutine, Separatist Street, Joliette," at (450) 760-7746 on Bell Mobility's  "Virgin" service played a key role in a robocall scandal in which voters in Guelph, Ontario were inundated with calls directing them to the wrong polling station.

Area code 354 was formally assigned as of February 2, 2019 as an additional area code for the 450/579 overlay complex, but the relief action was suspended indefinitely on October 8, 2019, and that area code is now in use since October 22, 2022.

The incumbent local exchange carrier (ILEC) for the 450, 579 and 354 territory is Bell Canada. The major competitive local exchange carriers (CLECs) are Vidéotron and Telus.

Service area and central office prefixes
 Abercorn: see Sutton
 Acton Vale: (450) 236 366 406 546 642
 Ange-Gardien: see Farnham
 Baie-du-Febvre: (450) 783
 Beauharnois: (450) 225 268 270 277 289 351 395 429 617
 Bedford: (450) 203 248 590 (579) 433
 Beloeil: (450) 262 281 339 446 464 467 527 536 600 714 813 864 (579) 229 600 883 949
 Berthierville: (450) 836 (579) 263 358
 Béthanie: see Roxton Falls
 Blainville: (450) 276 280 419 420 430 433 434 435 437 508 543 621 806 818 939 949 951 965 970 971 979 987 (579) 226 238 275 277 477 630 764 987
 Boucherville: (450) 274 300 356 363 449 552 641 645 650 655 857 868 891 906 (579) 215 230 882 900
 Bois-des-Filion: see Blainville
 Boisbriand: see Blainville
 Bolton-Est: see Potton
 Bolton-Ouest: see Lac-Brome
 Bonsecours: see Valcourt
 Brigham: see Cowansville
 Brome: see Lac-Brome
 Bromont: (450) 534 726 919
 Brossard: (450) 443 444 445 462 465 466 486 604 619 656 659 671 672 676 678 812 890 902 904 923 926 (579) 723 
 Brownsburg-Chatham: (450) 407 533 856
 Calixa-Lavallée: see Verchères
 Candiac: see Brossard
 Carignan: see Chambly
 Chambly: (450) 279 403 447 489 572 593 658 700 715 982 (579) 220 885
 Charlemagne: see Repentigny
 Châteauguay: (450) 201 287 507 691 692 698 699 716 844 977 (579) 288 860 977
 Chertsey: see Rawdon
 Clarenceville: (450) 294
 Contrecœur: (450) 392 401 503 573 587
 Coteau-du-Lac: (450) 308 316 740 763
 Cowansville: (450) 260 263 266 306 815 931 955 (579) 216
 Crabtree: (450) 389 607 754 (579) 264
 Delson: see Saint-Constant
 Deux-Montagnes: see Saint-Eustache
 Dundee: see Saint-Anicet
 Dunham: (450) 284 295 814 (579) 738
 East Farnham: see Cowansville
 Eastman: (450) 297 (579) 437 739
 Elgin: see Saint-Anicet
 Entrelacs: see Sainte-Marguerite-du-Lac-Masson
 Estérel: see Sainte-Marguerite-du-Lac-Masson
 Farnham: (450) 293 337 554 946
 Franklin: (450) 827 (579) 530
 Frelighsburg: (450) 298 (579) 440
 Godmanchester: see Saint-Anicet
 Gore: see Lachute
 Granby: (450) 204 305 320 330 360 361 372 375 378 405 521 522 525 531 558 574 577 578 762 770 775 776 777 830 877 915 956 991 994 (579) 232 361 488 589 595 787
 Havelock: see Saint-Chrysostome
 Hemmingford: (450) 247 636
 Henryville: (450) 299 (579) 722
 Hinchinbrooke: see Saint-Anicet
 Howick: see Très-Saint-Sacrement
 Hudson: (450) 202 309 458 853
 Huntingdon: see Saint-Anicet
 Joliette: (450) 271 365 386 394 398 404 421 499 559 750 751 752 753 755 756 757 758 759 760 803 867 875 898 916 917 944 960 (579) 244 248 337 500
 Kahnawake: see Saint-Constant
 Kanesatake: see Oka
 L'Assomption: (450) 588 589 591 705 713 749 938 (579) 262
 L'Épiphanie: see L'Assomption
 L'Île-Cadieux: see Vaudreuil-Dorion
 La Prairie: (450) 282 444 619 659 695 724 800 874 907 984 (579) 221 800 869 886
 La Présentation: see Saint-Hyacinthe
 La Visitation-de-l'Île-Dupas: see Berthierville
 La Visitation-de-Yamaska: see Saint-Zéphirin-de-Courval
 Lac-Brome: (450) 242 243 (579) 438 786
 Lac-des-Seize-Îles: see Morin-Heights
 Lachute: (450) 207 331 409 495 562 566 612 613
 Lacolle: (450) 246 604 (579) 431
 Lanoraie: (450) 887 (579) 261 865
 Laval: (450) 231 232 233 234 235 238 239 241 254 255 256 314 315 328 453 490 497 505 506 557 575 622 624 625 627 628 629 634 639 661 662 663 664 665 666 667 668 669 680 681 682 686 687 688 689 696 697 719 720 727 728 736 767 781 786 828 860 861 862 863 869 901 902 903 933 934 936 937 962 963 967 969 972 973 975 978 980 981 988 (579) 218 219 231 236 237 242 252 279 300 379 578 679 779 919 929 934 939 969 979 989
 Lavaltrie: (450) 368 540 541 547 576 586 608 935 (579) 260
 Lawrenceville: (450) 535
 Léry: see Châteauguay
 Les Cèdres: (450) 200 317 452 737
 Les Coteaux: see Saint-Zotique
 Longueuil: (450) 286 321 332 396 442 448 463 468 616 626 640 646 647 651 670 674 677 679 693 748 876 892 912 928 999 (579) 214 234 274 721 799 881 999
 Lorraine: see Blainville
 Mandeville: see Saint-Gabriel
 Maricourt: see Valcourt
 Marieville: (450) 460 708 725 900 (579) 222 400 859
 Mascouche: (450) 313 325 417 474 477 722 769 918 966 968 (579) 235
 Massueville: see Saint-Louis
 McMasterville: see Beloeil
 Mercier: see Châteauguay
 Mille-Isles: see Saint-Jérôme
 Mirabel: (450) 258 307 412 414 475 476 594 595 597 (579) 478 838 858
 Mont-Saint-Grégoire: see Saint-Jean-sur-Richelieu
 Mont-Saint-Hilaire: see Beloeil
 Morin Heights: (450) 226 644
 Napierville: (450) 245 570 (579) 430
 Notre-Dame-de-Lourdes: see Joliette
 Notre-Dame-de-Stanbridge: (450) 296 334
 Notre-Dame-des-Prairies: see Joliette
 Noyan: see Saint-Paul-de-l'Île-aux-Noix
 Odanak: see Pierreville
 Oka: (450) 415 479 596 (579) 828
 Ormstown: (450) 829 843
 Otterburn Park: see Beloeil
 Piedmont: see Saint-Sauveur
 Pierreville: (450) 345 568
 Pike River: see Bedford
 Pointe-des-Cascades: see Vaudreuil-Dorion
 Pointe-Calumet: see Saint-Eustache
 Pointe-Fortune: see Rigaud
 Potton: (450) 292 (579) 788
 Prévost: (450) 224 335 643 996
 Racine: see Valcourt
 Rawdon: (450) 333 834 865 882 (579) 258 864
 Repentigny: (450) 470 580 581 582 585 654 657 704 721 841 932 (579) 233 259
 Richelieu: see Chambly
 Rigaud: (450) 206 318 451 738 (579) 227
 Rivière-Beaudette: (450) 269 605
 Rosemère: see Blainville
 Rougemont: see Saint-Césaire
 Roxton: see Roxton Falls
 Roxton Falls: (450) 548 (579) 247
 Roxton Pond: see Granby
 Saint-Aimé: see Saint-Louis
 Saint-Alexandre: see Saint-Jean-sur-Richelieu
 Saint-Alexis: see Saint-Jacques
 Saint-Alphonse-de-Granby: see Granby
 Saint-Alphonse-Rodriguez: (450) 220 850 883
 Saint-Amable: see Sainte-Julie
 Saint-Ambroise-de-Kildare: see Joliette
 Saint-André-d'Argenteuil: (450) 528 537
 Saint-Anicet: (450) 264 957
 Saint-Antoine-sur-Richelieu: see Saint-Denis-sur-Richelieu
 Saint-Armand: see Bedford
 Saint-Barnabé-Sud: see Saint-Jude
 Saint-Barthélemy: (450) 842 885
 Saint-Basile-le-Grand: see Saint-Bruno-de-Montarville
 Saint-Bernard-de-Lacolle: see Lacolle
 Saint-Bernard-de-Michaudville: see Saint-Jude
 Saint-Blaise-sur-Richelieu: see Saint-Paul-de-l'Île-aux-Noix
 Saint-Bruno-de-Montarville: (450) 283 400 441 457 461 482 653 690 723 893 905 (579) 223 809 884
 Saint-Calixte: (450) 214 222 303
 Saint-Césaire: (450) 469 816 947 (579) 737
 Saint-Charles-Borromée: see Joliette
 Saint-Charles-sur-Richelieu: see Saint-Marc-sur-Richelieu
 Saint-Chrysostome: (450) 364 520 637 826
 Saint-Cléophas-de-Brandon: see Saint-Félix-de-Valois
 Saint-Clet: (450) 208 456 606 852
 Saint-Colomban: see Saint-Jérôme
 Saint-Côme: see Saint-Alphonse-Rodriguez
 Saint-Constant: (450) 290 387 509 632 633 635 638 718 845 993 (579) 435
 Saint-Cuthbert: see Berthierville
 Saint-Cyprien-de-Napierville: see Napierville
 Saint-Damase: (450) 342 344 408 797
 Saint-Damien: see Saint-Gabriel
 Saint-David: see Yamaska
 Saint-Denis-sur-Richelieu: (450) 213 787 909
 Saint-Didace: see Saint-Gabriel
 Saint-Dominique: see Saint-Hyacinthe
 Saint-Édouard: see Saint-Rémi
 Saint-Elphège: see Pierreville
 Saint-Esprit: see Sainte-Julienne
 Saint-Étienne-de-Beauharnois: see Beauharnois
 Saint-Étienne-de-Bolton: see Eastman
 Saint-Eustache: (450) 323 413 472 473 485 491 598 623 735 974 983 (579) 251 818 862
 Saint-Félix-de-Valois: (450) 221 837 889
 Saint-François-du-Lac: see Pierreville
 Saint-Gabriel: (450) 835 840 (579) 357
 Saint-Gabriel-de-Brandon: see Saint-Gabriel
 Saint-Gérard-Majella: see Yamaska
 Saint-Hippolyte: (450) 563
 Saint-Hugues: (450) 410 794 894
 Saint-Hyacinthe: (450) 209 223 230 250 251 252 253 261 278 383 385 418 440 484 488 501 502 513 518 768 771 773 774 778 779 796 799 847 888 924 998 (579) 225 228 239 268 452 489 509
 Saint-Ignace-de-Loyola: see Berthierville
 Saint-Ignace-de-Stanbridge: see Notre-Dame-de-Stanbridge
 Saint-Isidore: see Saint-Rémi
 Saint-Jacques: (450) 397 839 866 953
 Saint-Jacques-le-Mineur: see Saint-Jean-sur-Richelieu
 Saint-Jean-Baptiste: see Beloeil
 Saint-Jean-de-Matha: (450) 832 886
 Saint-Jean-sur-Richelieu: (450) 210 272 346 347 348 349 350 357 358 359 376 390 515 523 524 529 542 545 684 741 895 (579) 224 267 700
 Saint-Jérôme: (450) 275 304 327 431 432 436 438 504 512 516 530 553 560 565 569 592 602 660 675 694 710 712 820 821 822 848 858 990 (579) 240 278 765 888 990
 Saint-Joachim-de-Shefford: see Shefford
 Saint-Joseph-de-Sorel: see Sorel-Tracy
 Saint-Joseph-du-Lac: see Saint-Eustache
 Saint-Jude: (450) 423 790 792
 Saint-Lambert: (450) 259 341 443 445 462 465 466 486 500 550 618 648 656 671 672 673 676 678 761 766 812 878 890 896 904 923 926 (579) 241 266 720 880
 Saint-Lazare: see Vaudreuil-Dorion
 Saint-Liboire: (450) 793 (579) 245
 Saint-Liguori: see Joliette
 Saint-Lin-Laurentides: (450) 215 302 439
 Saint-Louis: (450) 788
 Saint-Louis-de-Gonzague: see Salaberry-de-Valleyfield
 Saint-Marc-sur-Richelieu: (450) 584 614 709 805
 Saint-Marcel-de-Richelieu: see Saint-Hugues
 Saint-Mathias-sur-Richelieu: see Chambly
 Saint-Mathieu: see Saint-Constant
 Saint-Mathieu-de-Beloeil: see Beloeil
 Saint-Michel: see Saint-Rémi
 Saint-Michel-des-Saints: (450) 833 870
 Saint-Nazaire-d'Acton: (450) 833 870
 Saint-Norbert: see Berthierville
 Saint-Ours: see Saint-Roch-de-Richelieu
 Saint-Patrice-de-Sherrington: see Saint-Rémi
 Saint-Paul: see Joliette
 Saint-Paul-d'Abbotsford: (450) 379 817 948
 Saint-Paul-de-l'Île-aux-Noix: (450) 291 930 945 (579) 432
 Saint-Philippe: see Brossard
 Saint-Pie: (450) 388 425 599 772 872
 Saint-Pie-de-Guire: (450) 706 784
 Saint-Pierre: see Joliette
 Saint-Placide: see Mirabel
 Saint-Polycarpe: (450) 216 265 526 620
 Saint-Rémi: (450) 301 454 481 615 992 (579) 434
 Saint-Robert: see Sainte-Victoire-de-Sorel
 Saint-Roch-de-l'Achigan: see L'Assomption
 Saint-Roch-de-Richelieu: (450) 402 571 785
 Saint-Roch-Ouest: see L'Assomption
 Saint-Sauveur: (450) 227 240 336 340 630 744 927 995
 Saint-Sébastien: see Saint-Jean-sur-Richelieu
 Saint-Simon: (450) 380 384 426 798
 Saint-Stanislas-de-Kostka: see Salaberry-de-Valleyfield
 Saint-Sulpice: see L'Assomption
 Saint-Télesphore: see Rivière-Beaudette
 Saint-Théodore-d'Acton: see Acton Vale
 Saint-Thomas: see Joliette
 Saint-Urbain-Premier: see Sainte-Martine
 Saint-Valentin: see Saint-Paul-de-l'Île-aux-Noix
 Saint-Valérien-de-Milton: see Upton
 Saint-Zénon: (450) 884
 Saint-Zéphirin-de-Courval: (450) 564
 Saint-Zotique: (450) 217 267 739 913
 Sainte-Adèle: (450) 229 745
 Sainte-Angèle-de-Monnoir: see Marieville
 Sainte-Anne-de-la-Rochelle: see Shefford
 Sainte-Anne-de-Sabrevois: see Saint-Jean-sur-Richelieu
 Sainte-Anne-de-Sorel: see Sorel-Tracy
 Sainte-Anne-des-Lacs: see Prévost
 Sainte-Anne-des-Plaines: (450) 205 478 707 838 940 941 (579) 479
 Sainte-Barbe: see Salaberry-de-Valleyfield
 Sainte-Béatrix: see Saint-Alphonse-Rodriguez
 Sainte-Brigide-d'Iberville: see Farnham
 Sainte-Catherine: see Saint-Constant
 Sainte-Cécile-de-Milton: see Granby
 Sainte-Clotilde: see Saint-Chrysostome
 Sainte-Émélie-de-l'Énergie: see Saint-Jean-de-Matha
 Sainte-Geneviève-de-Berthier: see Berthierville
 Sainte-Hélène-de-Bagot: (450) 381 480 791 997
 Sainte-Julie: (450) 324 338 649 685 733 804 922 986
 Sainte-Julienne: (450) 399 831 952
 Sainte-Justine-de-Newton: (450) 609 764
 Sainte-Madeleine: see Sainte-Marie-Madelaine
 Sainte-Marcelline-de-Kildare: see Saint-Alphonse-Rodriguez
 Sainte-Marguerite-du-Lac-Masson: (450) 228
 Sainte-Marie-Madeleine: (450) 355 493 496 701 702 703 795
 Sainte-Marie-Salomé: see Saint-Jacques
 Sainte-Marthe: (450) 391 459
 Sainte-Marthe-sur-le-Lac: see Saint-Eustache
 Sainte-Martine: (450) 212 427 498 519
 Sainte-Mélanie: see Saint-Félix-de-Valois
 Sainte-Sabine: (450) 393 (579) 394
 Sainte-Sophie: see Saint-Jérôme
 Sainte-Thérèse: see Blainville
 Sainte-Victoire-de-Sorel: (450) 422 782 989
 Salaberry-de-Valleyfield: (450) 219 288 322 369 370 371 373 374 377 544 567 601 631 747 801 802 807 854 859 921 (579) 250 491
 Shefford: (450) 539 734 920 (579) 439 797
 Sorel-Tracy: (450) 249 352 494 517 551 556 561 730 742 743 746 780 808 846 855 880 881 899 908 943 954 (579) 243 249
 Stanbridge East: see Bedford
 Stanbridge Station: see Bedford
 Stukely-Sud: see Eastman
 Sutton: (450) 538 (579) 436 789
 Terrebonne: (450) 312 326 416 471 492 729 765 824 914 961 964 (579) 808 863 914
 Très-Saint-Rédempteur: see Rigaud
 Très-Saint-Sacrement: (450) 237 353 603 825
 Upton: (450) 549
 Valcourt: (450) 532 (579) 246
 Varennes: (450) 285 652 731 809 925 929 985
 Vaudreuil-Dorion: (450) 218 319 424 455 510 732 897 (579) 217 490
 Vaudreuil-sur-le-Lac: see Vaudreuil-Dorion
 Venise-en-Québec: (450) 244 329
 Verchères: (450) 583 717 823 849
 Warden: see Shefford
 Waterloo: see Shefford
 Wentworth: see Lachute
 Wentworth-Nord: see Morin-Heights
 Yamaska: (450) 362 483 789
 Shared-cost service: (450) 310
 Premium service: (1+450/579) 976.

See also
List of NANP area codes
North American Numbering Plan

Notes

External links
CNA exchange list for area +1-450
CNA exchange list for area +1-579
Telecom archives
Area Code Map of Canada

450
Communications in Quebec